Eastern Administrative Okrug, or Vostochny Administrative Okrug, is one of the twelve high-level territorial divisions (administrative okrugs) of the federal city of Moscow, Russia. As of the 2010 Census, its population was 1,452,759, up from 1,394,497 recorded during the 2002 Census.

Territorial divisions
The administrative okrug comprises the following sixteen districts:
Bogorodskoye
Veshnyaki
Vostochnoye Izmaylovo
Vostochny
Golyanovo
Ivanovskoye
Izmaylovo
Kosino-Ukhtomsky
Metrogorodok
Novogireyevo
Novokosino
Perovo
Preobrazhenskoye
Severnoye Izmaylovo
Sokolinaya gora
Sokolniki

References

Notes

Sources

 
Administrative okrugs of Moscow